Friedrich Walter (21 February 1924 – January 1980) was an Austrian ice hockey player. He competed in the men's tournament at the 1948 Winter Olympics.

References

External links
 

1924 births
1980 deaths
Ice hockey players at the 1948 Winter Olympics
Olympic ice hockey players of Austria
Ice hockey people from Vienna